George Challis is the name of:

 George Challis, a pseudonym of Frederick Schiller Faust (1892–1944), an American western author known as Max Brand
George Challis (Australian rules footballer) (1891–1916), VFL
George Challis (rugby league), NSWRL